Ramil Sarkulov (born June 16, 1981, in Tashkent) is an Uzbekistani former competitive ice dancer. His partnership with Olesya Pronina lasted at least five seasons, until 1999. He then competed for three seasons with Julia Klochko (1999–2002), training under Galina Churilova in Kharkiv, Ukraine. Klochko/Sarkulov won the Uzbekistani national title in the 2001–02 season and appeared at four ISU Championships – two Four Continents and two Junior Worlds. In the 2002–03 season, he competed with Olga Akimova, coached by Churilova. Sarkulov then had a brief partnership with Ashley Taylor but the two never competed together. In 2007, he teamed up with Sun-hye Yu. Coached by Genrikh Sretenski in the United States, they placed 12th at the 2008 Four Continents and 29th at the 2008 World Championships.

Sarkulov works as a skating coach in Maryland. He has coached Rachel Parsons / Michael Parsons (2016 World Junior silver medalists) and Eliana Gropman / Ian Somerville.

Programs

With Yu

With Duenas

With Akimova

With Klochko

Competitive highlights 
JGP: Junior Grand Prix

With Akimova, Duenas, and Yu

With Klochko

With Pronina

References 

1981 births
Figure skating coaches
Uzbekistani male ice dancers
Living people
Sportspeople from Tashkent
Uzbekistani emigrants to the United States
Dancers from Tashkent